Mathieu Traoré (born 22 April 1972) is a Burkinabé footballer. He played in one match for the Burkina Faso national football team in 2000. He was also named in Burkina Faso's squad for the 2000 African Cup of Nations tournament.

References

External links
 

1972 births
Living people
Burkinabé footballers
Burkina Faso international footballers
2000 African Cup of Nations players
Place of birth missing (living people)
Association footballers not categorized by position
21st-century Burkinabé people